Laurențiu Țigăeru Roșca (born February 27, 1970) is a Romanian politician.

He was born in Focșani and graduated from the Bucharest Academy of Economic Studies in 1999.

References

1970 births
Living people
People from Focșani
Bucharest Academy of Economic Studies alumni
National Liberal Party (Romania) politicians
Members of the Chamber of Deputies (Romania)